is a private junior college in Hirakata, Osaka, Japan. It was established as a junior college in 1953, and is now attached to Kansai Gaidai University.

Departments
 Department of English studies

External links
 

Private universities and colleges in Japan
Japanese junior colleges
Universities and colleges in Osaka Prefecture